Aya, in comics, may refer to:

Aya of Yopougon, a graphic novel series by Marguerite Abouet and Clement Oubrerie
Aya, a character in the AK Comics series
Aya (DC Comics), a fictional character featured in comic books published by DC Comics.

See also
Aya (disambiguation)